Raymie is a 1960 drama film directed by Frank McDonald and starring David Ladd. It is perhaps best known for its title song, which was sung by comedian Jerry Lewis and written by Ronald Stein.

Plot
A nine-year-old boy and an experienced fisherman dream to catch a barracuda known as Old Moe. However, when the fish is caught, the boy and fisherman regret their act and see that the fish's life has meaning.

Cast
 David Ladd as Raymie Boston
 Julie Adams as Helen
 John Agar as Ike
 Charles Winninger as R. J. Parsons
 Richard Arlen as Garber
 Frank Ferguson as Rex
 Ray Kellogg as Neil
 John Damler as John
 Jester Hairston as Veulo

External links

1960 films
Allied Artists films
Films about fishing
Films scored by Ronald Stein
1960 drama films
Films directed by Frank McDonald
1960s English-language films